Cayetano Santos Godino (October 31, 1896 – November 15, 1944), also known as  ("the big-eared midget"), was an Argentinian serial killer who terrorized Buenos Aires at age 16. In the early 20th century he was responsible for the murder of four children, the attempted murder of another seven children, and seven counts of arson.

Early life
Cayetano was born in Buenos Aires, Argentina, one of eight boys. His father and mother, Fiore Godino and Lucia Ruffo, were Italians who chose to disembark in Argentina hoping to improve their life but they were abusive alcoholics. Cayetano's father contracted syphilis before Cayetano was born, causing him to experience serious childhood health problems.

Early signs of social mismanagement 
Starting in childhood, Cayetano killed cats and birds, and enjoyed playing with fire. His violent behavior and lack of interest in education caused him to move from school to school.

In 1904 when he was seven years old, Cayetano beat two-year-old Miguel de Paoli and threw him into a ditch. A nearby official saw this and led the children to the police station, where their mothers picked them up a few hours later.

The next year, 1905, Cayetano beat Ana Neri, a child in his neighborhood, with a stone. A police officer intervened, but Cayetano was released from jail due to his young age.

In 1906, Cayetano killed three-year-old Maria Rosa Face. It was his first murder, but it went unnoticed and would only be discovered years later when he confessed to the police himself. He said that in 1906 he took a girl, about three years old, to the wasteland on Rio de Janeiro Street, where he attempted to strangle her. Then he buried her alive in a ditch, which he covered with cans. The authorities, upon learning of this crime, moved to the site but found that a two-story house had been built there. However, a missing-persons complaint dated 29 March 1906 of a three-year-old girl named Maria Rosa Face was filed at the 10th police station. The missing girl was never found.

When he was 10, Cayetano's parents grew tired of his compulsive masturbation and irreverence. Not knowing what to do, his father reported him to the police, resulting in a two-month jail term for him.

Crime spree 
On January 17, 1912, Cayetano set fire to a warehouse on Corrientes Street. When he was arrested, he told police, "I like to see firemen working. It's nice to see how they fall into the fire." On January 26, 1912, Arturo Laurona, 13, was found dead in an abandoned house. A month and a half later, on March 7, 1912, Cayetano set fire to the dress of 5-year-old Reyna Vainicoff, who did not recover and died some days later.

In late September, 1912, he set fire to a railway station. The fire was extinguished without extensive damage. On November 8, 1912, he tried to choke 8-year-old Roberto Russo. He was arrested and charged with attempted murder, but was released until the trial. On November 16, 1912, he assaulted three-year-old  Carmen Ghittoni, who suffered minor wounds before a police officer intervened and Cayetano ran off. On November 20, 1912, he kidnapped two-year-old Carolina Neolener, who cried out and was rescued by a neighbor. Later that month, he set fire to two large sheds, but the fires were quickly extinguished.

On December 3, 1912, Cayetano saw 3-year-old Jesualdo Giordano playing outside his house and offered to buy the boy some sweets to convince him to go with him. Providing a few sweets and offering more, Cayetano took Giordano to a country house. When they were inside, he threw him to the floor and unsuccessfully tried to choke him with his belt. Then he cut his belt and tied his hands and legs. He started beating him and considered hammering his head. He left the house looking for a nail and saw Giordano's father, to whom he said he did not know where the boy was. He then re-entered the house with the nail. He hammered it into the side of Giordano's skull and hid the corpse. The body was found by the father minutes later. At 8:00 PM, Cayetano went to the wake and touched the skull where he had fixed the nail. At 5:30 a.m. on December 4, 1912, he was arrested by police, confessing to his crimes.

Jail
On January 4, 1913, he entered a reformatory, where he tried to kill some of the inmates. Because medical reports declared him insane, the judge discontinued the case and ordered him to stay in the reformatory. On November 12, 1915, an appeal was approved ordering him to be moved to jail on November 20.

On March 28, 1923, Cayetano was transferred to Ushuaia Penitentiary. Throughout 1933 he spent some time in the hospital for a beating he suffered from inmates after he killed two of their pet cats. From 1935 onwards, he was always ill and received no visitors until he died on November 15, 1944 under suspicious circumstances.

See also
List of serial killers by country
Mateo Banks
Robledo Puch
Ricardo Barreda

References

Bibliography
Santos Godino (Spanish)

1896 births
1944 deaths
Argentine arsonists
Argentine murderers of children
Argentine people convicted of murder
Argentine people of Italian descent
Argentine people who died in prison custody
Argentine serial killers
Male serial killers
People convicted of murder by Argentina
People from Buenos Aires
Prisoners who died in Argentine detention
Serial killers who died in prison custody